Markku Pusenius (born 29 May 1964 in Lahti) is a Finnish former ski jumper who competed from 1981 to 1986. He won a gold medal in the team large hill at the 1984 FIS Nordic World Ski Championships in Engelberg. Pusenius's best individual finish was second twice (1982, 1983). He also competed at the 1984 Winter Olympics.

References

External links

1964 births
Living people
Sportspeople from Lahti
Finnish male ski jumpers
FIS Nordic World Ski Championships medalists in ski jumping
Olympic ski jumpers of Switzerland
Ski jumpers at the 1984 Winter Olympics
20th-century Finnish people